Silvestri's worm lizard (Amphisbaena silvestrii) is a species of worm lizard in the family Amphisbaenidae. The species is endemic to South America.

Etymology
The specific name, silvestrii, is in honor of Italian entomologist Filippo Silvestri.

Geographic range
A. silvestrii is found in Bolivia (department of Santa Cruz), and also in Brazil (state of Mato Grosso).

Habitat
The preferred natural habitats of A. silvestrii are forest and savanna.

Description
A. silvestrii has two precloacal pores, a character present in only about 20% of species of Amphisbaena.

Reproduction
A. silvestrii is oviparous.

See also
List of reptiles of Brazil

References

Further reading
Boulenger GA (1902). "Descriptions of new Fishes and Reptiles discovered by Dr. F. Silvestri in South America". Annals and Magazine of Natural History, Seventh Series 9 (52): 284-288. (Amphisbæna silvestrii, new species, p. 287).
Cassel, Mônica; Calcanhoto, Karla K. N.; Mehanna, Mahmoud; Montezol, Michel; Ferreira, Adelina; Mott, Tamí (2017). "Spermatogenisis of Amphisbaena silvestrii (Boulenger, 1902) [sic]: First Report for Amphisbaenidae". Journal of Herpetology 51 (1): 109-113.
Gans C (1962). "Redefinition and Description of the Brasilian Reptiles Amphisbaena silvestrii Boulenger and A. neglecta Dunn and Piatt". Copeia 1962 (1): 164-170.
Gans C (2005). "Checklist and Bibliography of the Amphisbaenia of the World". Bulletin of the American Museum of Natural History (289): 1-130. (Amphisbaena silvestrii, p. 19).
Ribeiro S, Sá V, Santos AP, Graboski R, Zaher H, Guedes AG, Andrade SP, Vaz-Silva W (2019). "A new species of the Amphisbaena (Squamata, Amphisbaenidae) from the Brazilian Cerrado with a key for the two-pored species". Zootaxa 4550 (3): 301–320.
Vanzolini PE (2002). "An aid to the identification of South American species of Amphisbaena (Squamata, Amphisbaenidae)". Papéis Avulsos de Zoologia, Museu de Zoologia da Universidade de São Paulo 42 (15): 351-362.

silvestrii
Reptiles described in 1902
Taxa named by George Albert Boulenger